The first season of the American television drama series Mad Men premiered on July 19, 2007 and ended on October 18, 2007. It consisted of thirteen episodes, each running approximately 47 minutes. AMC broadcast the first season on Thursdays at 10:00 pm in the United States. Actors Jon Hamm, Elisabeth Moss, Vincent Kartheiser, January Jones, Christina Hendricks, Bryan Batt, Michael Gladis, Aaron Staton, and Rich Sommer receive main cast billing. 

Season one takes place between March and November 1960. It introduces the fictional advertising agency Sterling Cooper. The season begins with the new secretary, Peggy Olson, starting her first day with the firm. As the season unfolds, the mysterious backstory of enigmatic ad man Don Draper is revealed as is the growing confidence and success of Peggy Olson.

The first season was highly commended for its excellence in writing, acting, and art design, as well as for its faithfulness to the era it depicted. It was acknowledged with numerous honors from industry awards, including the Primetime Emmy Award for Outstanding Drama Series, the Golden Globe Award for Best Drama Series, and a Peabody Award.

Cast

Main cast
 Jon Hamm as Don Draper
 Elisabeth Moss as Peggy Olson
 Vincent Kartheiser as Pete Campbell
 January Jones as Betty Draper
 Christina Hendricks as Joan Holloway
 Bryan Batt as Salvatore Romano
 Michael Gladis as Paul Kinsey
 Aaron Staton as Ken Cosgrove
 Rich Sommer as Harry Crane
 Maggie Siff as Rachel Menken

Recurring cast

Guest stars
 Deborah Lacey as Carla
 Darren Pettie as Lee Garner, Jr.

Plot

The first season opens in March 1960, as genius advertising executive Donald "Don" Draper meets Peggy Olson, his new secretary. They both work at the small but prestigious agency Sterling Cooper. Though Don is welcoming towards her, Peggy is subject to passive-aggressive hostility from office manager Joan Holloway and sexual harassment from her male colleagues. Junior accounts manager Pete Campbell, who is about to get married, takes a liking to Peggy and the two have sex the night of his bachelor party. Don, meanwhile, has trouble balancing his life as he cheats on his wife, Betty Draper, with a beatnik artist named Midge Daniels. Roger Sterling, the acerbic son of one of Sterling Cooper's founding partners, cheats on his wife, Mona, with Joan, of whom he is enamored. 

Sterling Cooper begins working for the 1960 Richard Nixon presidential campaign, gratis and unbidden, as they believe Nixon's success against John F. Kennedy will benefit their business. They are also working to reassure their largest client, Lucky Strike, whose account is the firm's bread and butter, in the face of resurgent medical research demonstrating smoking is harmful and related lawsuits and impending legislation harmful to the tobacco industry.

Betty begins seeing a psychiatrist after her numb and shaking hands cause her to crash the family car. Don, initially resistant to the idea of psychotherapy, allows Betty to seek help. Behind Betty's back, Don has Betty's doctor report back to Don what Betty says in treatment. Meanwhile, Don begins a flirtatious relationship with Rachel Menken, the Jewish owner of a department store who seeks marketing help at Sterling Cooper.

Don also has to deal with the arrival of his younger brother, Adam Whitman, who refers to Don as "Dick Whitman". Don gives Adam $5,000 and tells him to make a new life for himself, as Don did, and to never contact Don again.

Flashbacks to Don's childhood as "Dick Whitman", during the Great Depression, depict Dick's relationships with his unloving, pious stepmother, who calls him a "whore-child", and abusive father Archibald Whitman, who cheats a hobo out of promised payment for performing chores. Dick had grown friendly with the vagrant, and the incident further degrades his image of his father.  Additionally, the vagrant teaches young Dick the hobo code, which communicates important messages via simple visual symbols. Don finds a weathered hobo sign indicating Don's father is a dishonest man.

Peggy begins writing copy after ad man Freddy Rumsen recognizes her talent. She is soon given control of her own account, creating a campaign for a weight loss machine. Peggy's work on the weight loss machine coincides with her own weight gain. 

Roger suffers two heart attacks, drastically changing his outlook on life, and prompting Lucky Strike's owner, Lee Garner, Sr., to warn Bert Cooper that keeping Lucky Strike's account requires Sterling Cooper to do something to "show Don Sterling Cooper appreciates him". Bert then offers Don a partnership, with a 12% share of the business (without Don having to pay a partnership fee). Don accepts, provided he's not required to sign a contract; an amused Bert agrees, and acknowledges Don's attitude calls back to Ayn Rand's philosophy, as expressed in the book Bert had earlier urged Don to read: Atlas Shrugged.

Don's first order of business is to appoint a new head of accounts (to lighten Roger's load as partner and rainmaker), and Don begins interviewing external candidates (to Pete's chagrin). The most promising candidate proves to be Herman "Duck" Phillips, who "landed American Airlines", but is looking for a job after alcoholism and an extramarital affair ended his career at Y&R's London office.

After the partners leave for the day, the Sterling Cooper ad men throw a raucous party the night of the 1960 presidential election, but see their client and preferred choice, Nixon, defeated by Kennedy.

Further flashbacks revolve around Dick Whitman's origin story in the Korean War, in which he is put under the command of a Lieutenant Donald Draper, who is soon to be sent home. After an attack, an accidental explosion kills Draper and injures Whitman. Whitman switches dog tags with his lieutenant and assumes Draper's identity as a way to escape the war. The Army has "Draper" take Whitman's body back to Whitman's family. The coffin is dropped off by train, and Whitman does not exit to greet his family, but a young Adam sees Whitman standing inside the train. Adam's parents dismiss his entreaties that, "I see Dick on the train". A female train passenger notices Whitman's look of grief and tells him to "forget that boy in the box". Whitman then turns his back on his family and begins his new life as "Donald Draper".

Pete, who has demonstrated a propensity to snoop, expresses the belief that he should be promoted to head of accounts and throws his hat in the ring. He has also revealed his jealousy about Peggy and Don's success and sits at Don's desk after the two have left for the day. The mailroom boy mistakes Pete for Don and delivers a package from Adam Whitman filled with Dick Whitman's dog tags and childhood photographs. (Adam posted the package immediately before hanging himself in his hotel room).

Pete confronts Don with the information that he knows Don's real name is Dick Whitman and attempts to blackmail him for a promotion. Don neutralizes the threat by telling Bert, "I've pulled the trigger on hiring Duck Phillips," which he knew would incite Pete to reveal Don's true identity to Bert. Pete tells Bert that Don is a deserter who isn't who he says he is, but Bert brushes it off with "Who cares?" After Pete leaves the room, Bert gives Don the option to either fire Pete or keep a close eye on him, as "one never knows how loyalty is born."

Peggy seeks medical care for severe stomach pain. The doctor quickly realizes Peggy's weight gain is a result of a pregnancy; she was impregnated by Pete Campbell. After the child is delivered, the nurse encourages Peggy to hold the baby, but Peggy refuses.

The season ends just before Thanksgiving 1960, as Betty and Don bicker over Don's lack of interest in attending Thanksgiving dinner with Betty's family. Don cites his workload as his reason to stay home. Soon afterwards, Betty discovers Don was receiving calls from her psychiatrist, who was reporting on her sessions to Don. Don also learns that his brother Adam has hanged himself. 

Don subsequently makes a new campaign presentation for the Kodak Carousel that revolves around the "power of nostalgia".

During a train ride, Don has a vision of returning home to announce he will be joining the family for Thanksgiving. Instead, Don returns home to find the house dark and empty. He sits alone at the bottom of the staircase as the season closes.

Episodes

Production

Filming

The pilot episode was shot at Silvercup Studios and various locations around New York City; subsequent episodes have been filmed at Los Angeles Center Studios. It is available in high definition for showing on AMC-HD and on video-on-demand services available from various cable affiliates. The writers, including Weiner, amassed volumes of research on the period in which Mad Men takes place so as to make most aspects of the series—including detailed set designs, costume design, and props—historically accurate, producing an authentic visual style that garnered critical praise. Each episode has a budget of $2–2.5 million, though the pilot episode's budget was over $3 million. On the scenes featuring smoking, Weiner stated: "Doing this show without smoking would've been a joke. It would've been sanitary and it would've been phony." Since the actors cannot, by California law, smoke tobacco cigarettes in their workplace, they instead smoke herbal cigarettes.

Crew
In addition to having created the series, Matthew Weiner is the showrunner, head writer, and an executive producer; he contributes to each episode—writing or co-writing the scripts, casting various roles, and approving costume and set designs. He is notorious for being selective about all aspects of the series, and promotes a high level of secrecy around production details. 

Along with Matthew Weiner, the writing staff of the first season consisted of co-executive producer Tom Palmer, who wrote two episodes; producer Lisa Albert, who wrote two episodes; producers and writing team Andre and Maria Jacquemetton, who wrote three episodes; writer's assistant Robin Veith, who wrote two episodes; and freelance writers Bridget Bedard and Chris Provenzano, who each wrote two episodes. Other producers included co-producer Blake McCormick, producer Todd London, and co-executive producer Scott Hornbacher. Primary directors of the first season were Tim Hunter, who directed four episodes, and Alan Taylor, who directed three including the pilot episode. The remaining episodes were directed by Ed Bianchi, Lesli Linka Glatter, Andrew Bernstein, series cinematographer Phil Abraham, Paul Feig, and series creator Matthew Weiner, who directs each season finale.

Reception

Ratings 
The premiere episode, which aired at 10:00 p.m. on July 19, 2007, was rated higher than any other AMC original series at the time, and attained a 1.4 household rating (1.2 million households). The season averaged 900,000 viewers.

Critical reception 
The first season of Mad Men received generally favorable reviews from critics. Review aggregator Rotten Tomatoes reports that 87% of 30 critics have given the season a positive review. The site's consensus is: "Oozing evocative early 1960s ambiance, Mad Men is a sly, subversive look at the American workplace that radiates class, wit, and an undercurrent of disaffection." On Metacritic, the first season scored 77 out of 100 based on 32 reviews, indicating generally favorable reviews.

Tim Goodman of The Hollywood Reporter said each episode "unfolded like a small movie", calling it "one of the best character studies anyone has put on television in some time – an adult drama of introspection and the inconvenience of modernity in a man's world." Robert Bianco of USA Today said the show "hopes to come to grips with both what was lost and what has been gained since generation gaps, sexual revolutions, racial divides and Vietnam blasted the '60s apart" and called it a "smart, complex drama". The New York Times called it "both a drama and a comedy and all the better for it, a series that breaks new ground by luxuriating in the not-so-distant past."  DVD Talk writer Adam Tyner described the season as "virtually flawless", praising the depth with which each of the characters has been written. Andrew Johnson praised the initial episode in Time Out New York  stating: "Inspired by cynical Eisenhower-era comedies of manners (Sweet Smell of Success, The Apartment) and the stories of John Cheever, frequent Sopranos writer Matthew Weiner's Mad Men is a scathing chronicle of the ad industry’s boozy midcentury heyday, and one of the freshest series to hit basic cable in years."

Varietys reaction to the first season was more mixed, commenting that "as a serialized drama, the program's situations aren't especially stirring, even with its solid, perfectly outfitted cast. The sheer atmosphere, however, proves intoxicating." Tom Shales of The Washington Post wrote a negative review, stating that "the stories unfold in a dry, drab way and the pacing is desultory. Series directors are fond of long pauses that serve no purpose other than to give the impression that an actor forgot his next line."

Accolades 
The first season of Mad Men was nominated for and won numerous industry awards, including fifteen Emmy nominations and six Emmy wins. At the 60th Primetime Emmy Awards, Mad Men won Outstanding Drama Series and Outstanding Writing in a Drama Series (Matthew Weiner for "Smoke Gets in Your Eyes"). The series also won Creative Arts Emmys for Art Direction, Cinematography, Hairstyling, and Main Title Design.

The series also received nominations for Outstanding Lead Actor in a Drama Series (Jon Hamm), Outstanding Supporting Actor in a Drama Series (John Slattery), Outstanding Guest Actor in a Drama Series (Robert Morse), Outstanding Directing in a Drama Series (Alan Taylor), again for "Smoke Gets in Your Eyes") and a second nomination for Outstanding Writing in a Drama Series (Weiner and Robin Veith, for "The Wheel"). 

Mad Men won a Peabody Award for Outstanding Achievement in Television for the first season in 2007. AMC Executive Vice President Charles Collier called the award an "incredible honor". The first season was also honored by the American Film Institute as one of the ten greatest television achievements of 2007, called it brilliant for depicting "the discomfort that hides in the dark corners of nostalgia", and said "The show's extraordinary writing, characterizations and art direction neatly package a time filtered through the haze of cigarettes and sexism, but the message is for today — that those who sell a way of life are often mad for a world that is not their own."

The series won Best Television Drama Series at the 65th Golden Globe Awards, while Jon Hamm won Best Actor – Television Series Drama. "Smoke Gets in Your Eyes" also won a Casting Society of America Artios Award for Outstanding Casting in a Television Pilot, Drama. Alan Taylor won a 2007 Directors Guild of America Award for Drama Series directing "Smoke Gets in Your Eyes". The series also won 2007 Writers Guild Awards for Best Dramatic Series and Best New Series. Chris Provenzano for "The Hobo Code" was nominated for the Episode Drama award, but lost to The Sopranos episode, "The Second Coming". 

The first season was also honored by the Television Critics Association Awards, winning Program of the Year, Outstanding Achievement in Drama, and Outstanding New Program of the Year. Jon Hamm was also nominated for Individual Achievement in Drama at the 24th TCA Awards.

Jon Hamm and the cast Mad Men were also nominated at the 14th Screen Actors Guild Awards for Outstanding Performance by a Male Actor in a Drama Series and Outstanding Performance by an Ensemble in a Drama Series but lost to James Gandolfini and the cast of The Sopranos, respectively.

Home media release
The first season was released on DVD and Blu-ray in region 1 on July 1, 2008. In addition to the thirteen episodes, the discs include 26 audio commentaries by cast and crew, and featurettes regarding the production of the series and mini-documentaries on media culture and the historical time in which the story is set. Featurettes include "Establishing Mad Men", "Advertising the American Dream", and "Scoring Mad Men". Also included is a music sampler for music from the show, a photo gallery, and a season two preview.

References

External links
 
 

2007 American television seasons
 
Television series set in 1960
Korean War fiction